The 2017 Big East men's basketball tournament was the postseason tournament men's basketball tournament for the Big East Conference.  It was held from March 8 through March 11, 2017 at Madison Square Garden in New York City. The championship was won by Villanova who defeated Creighton in the championship game. The tournament win was Villanova's third all-time tournament championship and second in the prior three years. As a result, Villanova received the conference's automatic bid to the NCAA tournament.

Seeds
All 10 Big East schools participated in the tournament. Teams were seeded by the conference record with tie-breaking procedures to determine the seeds for teams with identical conference records. The top six teams received first-round byes. Seeding for the tournament was determined at the close of the regular conference season.

Schedule

Bracket

All-Tournament team
Trevon Bluiett, Xavier
Jalen Brunson, Villanova
Ángel Delgado, Seton Hall
Marcus Foster, Creighton
Josh Hart, Villanova
Kris Jenkins, Villanova

Dave Gavitt Trophy (Most Outstanding Player)
Josh Hart, Villanova

See also

2017 Big East women's basketball tournament

References

Tournament
Big East men's basketball tournament
College sports tournaments in New York City
Basketball competitions in New York City
Sports in Manhattan
Big East men's basketball tournament
Big East men's basketball tournament
2010s in Manhattan